The Kumamoto International Road Race was a professional cycling race held annually in Japan. It was part of UCI Asia Tour in category 1.2.

Winners

References

UCI Asia Tour races
Cycle races in Japan
Recurring sporting events established in 2009
Recurring sporting events disestablished in 2010
2009 establishments in Japan
2010 disestablishments in Japan
Defunct cycling races in Japan
Sports competitions in Kumamoto Prefecture